The 1906–07 Drexel Blue and Gold men's basketball team represented Drexel Institute of Art, Science and Industry during the 1906–07 men's basketball season. The Blue and Gold, led by 2nd year head coach Walter S. Brokaw, played their home games at Main Building.

Roster

Schedule

|-
!colspan=9 style="background:#F8B800; color:#002663;"| Regular season
|-

References

Drexel Dragons men's basketball seasons
Drexel
1906 in sports in Connecticut
1907 in sports in Connecticut